John Greenway (15 December 1919 – 15 October 1991) was born Johannes Groeneweg in Liverpool, England. He was a noted author, singer and scholar who focused on American folk songs of protest.

Academic career
He received his Ph.D. from the University of Pennsylvania, where his dissertation was on "American Folksongs of Social and Economic Protest." It was later published as American Folksongs of Protest (University of Pennsylvania Press 1953), which was the standard work in the field for 40 years.  He also studied protest folk songs in Australia.  He recorded The Great American Bum and Other Hobo and Migratory Workers' Songs, and American Industrial Folksongs, both released by Riverside Records. In the 1950s he was a Professor of English at University of Denver.  He was professor of anthropology in the late 1960s through the 1970s at the University of Colorado in Boulder, at times angering the establishment there.

During this time he wrote prolifically for conservative magazine The National Review. His columns remain highly controversial; after a 1969 column in defense of the genocide of Native Americans (in which he wrote, “Did the United States destroy the American Indian? No, but it should have.”), he responded to Native critics in a mock-pidgin dialect, saying that the “[C]hicken tracks of red brother ... makeum paleface heart heavy.”

He authored or edited 19 books, wrote hundreds of articles and reviews, and was for many years editor of the Journal of American Folklore, Southwestern Lore, and Western Folklore (acting).

Other popular works by Greenway include The Inevitable Americans (1964) and Literature Among the Primitives (1964). Many consider his best work to be Down Among the Wild Men, an account of his studies among the Aborigines of Australia, a people he greatly admired, and indeed found to be superior to the decadent white man of the Western world. This book was one time a Book of the Month Club selection.

Musical career
Greenway was also a collector and performer of songs in the talking blues genre. In 1958 he released the album Talking Blues, a collection of 15 songs which he had recorded and annotated.

Discography
1955 (recorded): American Industrial Folksongs, Riverside Records 12-607
1958: Talking Blues, Folkways Records
1960: Australian Folksongs And Ballads, Folkways Records (FW 8718)
1961: The Cat Came Back And Other Fun Songs, Prestige/International (13011)
 The Great American Bum: Hobo And Migratory Workers' Songs, Riverside Records (RLP 12-619)

References

External links 
 

American folklorists
University of Pennsylvania alumni
American folk singers
1919 births
1991 deaths
20th-century American singers
Folkways Records artists
Riverside Records artists
British emigrants to the United States